Phracyps lebisella is a moth in the family Xyloryctidae. It was described by Viette in 1955. It is found in Madagascar.

References

Xyloryctidae
Moths described in 1955